National nature reserves in England are designated by Natural England as key places for wildlife and natural features in England. They were established to protect the most significant areas of habitat and of geological formations. NNRs are managed on behalf of the nation, many by Natural England itself, but also by non-governmental organisations, including the members of The Wildlife Trusts partnership, the National Trust, and the Royal Society for the Protection of Birds.

There are 229 NNRs in England covering . Often they contain rare species or nationally important species of plants, insects, butterflies, birds, mammals, etc.

Spotlight NNRs
Natural England has selected 35 as spotlight reserves:

Ainsdale Sand Dunes NNR, Merseyside
Aston Rowant NNR, Oxfordshire
Barnack Hills & Holes NNR, Cambridgeshire
Castle Eden Dene, County Durham
Derbyshire Dales NNR, Derbyshire
Duncombe Park NNR, North Yorkshire
Durham Coast, County Durham
East Dartmoor Woods and Heaths NNR, Devon
Farne Islands NNR, Northumberland
Fenn's, Whixall and Bettisfield Mosses NNR, Shropshire/Wales
Finglandrigg Woods NNR, Cumbria
Gait Barrows NNR, Lancashire
Gibraltar Point NNR, Lincolnshire
Golitha Falls NNR, Cornwall
Holkham NNR, Norfolk
Ingleborough NNR, North Yorkshire
Kingley Vale NNR, West Sussex
Lindisfarne, Northumberland
Lower Derwent Valley NNR, East Riding of Yorkshire
Moor House-Upper Teesdale, Cumbria & County Durham
North Meadow, Cricklade NNR, Wiltshire
Old Winchester Hill NNR, Hampshire
Redgrave and Lopham Fen, Norfolk & Suffolk
Saltfleetby-Theddlethorpe Dunes NNR, Lincolnshire
Shapwick Heath NNR, Somerset
Slapton Ley NNR, Devon
Stiperstones NNR, Shropshire
Stodmarsh NNR, Kent
Studland and Godlingston Heath NNR, Dorset
Teesmouth NNR, Teesside
The Lizard NNR, Cornwall
Suffolk Coast NNR, Suffolk
Thursley NNR, Surrey
Wicken Fen, Cambridgeshire
Wye NNR, Kent

For a full list of English NNRs, see List of national nature reserves in England

See also
Nature reserve
National nature reserve (United Kingdom)
Nature reserves in Northern Ireland
National nature reserve (Scotland)
National nature reserves in Wales

References

External links
 Interactive map of designations in England from sketchmap.co.uk, including National Nature Reserves boundaries (select 'Nature Reserves' in UK map layers)

 
England-related lists